Up and Down, or variants, may refer to:

Up and down, relative direction

Film and TV
 Up and Down (1965 film), an Italian film
 Up and Down (2004 film), a Czech film
 Up and Down, a spin-off of short film Luxo Jr., featured in Sesame Street
 Up & Down: Mukalil Oralundu, a 2013 Malayalam psychological thriller film

Games
 Up'n Down, a 1983 arcade game
 Up and down, a traveling violation in basketball

Music

Albums
 Up & Down (album), by American jazz pianist Horace Parlan
 Up and Down (Opus album), 1984, or the title track
 Up and Down (Liane Carroll album), 2011
 Up and Down (She Wants Revenge EP), 2009

Songs
 "Up and Down" (song), a 1998 song by Vengaboys
 "Up & Down" (song), a 2014 song by EXID
 "Up N' Down", a 2011 song by Britney Spears from Femme Fatale
 "Up and Down", a 1980 song by The Cars from Panorama
"Up and Down", a 2021 song by Doja Cat from Planet Her
 "Up and Down", a 1958 song by Duane Eddy
 "Up and Down", a 1966 single by Eyes of Blue
 "Up and Down", a 1990 single by The High
 "Up and Down", a 1967 single by John Fred
 "Up and Down", a 1966 single by The McCoys
 "Up and Down", a 1974 single by The Shoes
 "Up and Down", a 1970 Sesame Street song by The Cookie Monster and Harry Monster 
 "Up/Down", a 2008 song by Jessica Mauboy
 "Up Down (Do This All Day)", a 2013 song by T-Pain
 "Up Down" (Morgan Wallen song), 2017

See also
 Ups and Downs (disambiguation)